Mount Adams, elevation  above sea level, is a mountain in New Hampshire, the second highest peak in the Northeast United States after its nearby neighbor, Mount Washington.  Located in the northern Presidential Range, Mount Adams was named after John Adams, the second President of the United States. It was given this name on July 31, 1820.  To the northeast is Mount Madison and to the southwest is Mount Jefferson. From the summit, Mount Washington can be seen directly to the south.

There are two major subsidiary peaks of Mount Adams: Mount Sam Adams and Mount Quincy Adams, named after John Adams' cousin, Revolutionary leader Samuel Adams, and son, President John Quincy Adams, respectively, and two minor sub-peaks, Abigail Adams (named for John Adams' wife Abigail) and Adams 5. The northern side of the mountain ridge is located in Low and Burbank's Grant, and the end of Durand Ridge, and King Ravine, on the north side of Mount Adams are in the town of Randolph (formerly Durand). The entire south side of the mountain ridge is in Thompson and Meserve's Purchase.

The Appalachian Trail traverses the col between Mount Adams and Mount Sam Adams on the Gulfside Trail. The  Randolph Mountain Club (RMC) maintains the trails and several huts and shelters high on Mount Adams' north side, including "The Perch", "Crag Camp", "The Log Cabin", and "Gray Knob".  A large network of hiking and climbing paths lead south to the huts and ridges from several parking areas located on U.S. Highway 2.

The Aetherius Society claims that Mount Adams is one of 19 "holy mountains" around the world.

Climbing and recreation
Mount Adams is a popular hiking and climbing destination for experienced and novice mountaineers alike. The mountain is climbed in all four seasons, although it is more often climbed from late spring through early fall. The peak is known to have dangerously erratic weather, especially in winter. There is a prominent sign just prior to the most exposed section of Mount Adams urging hikers to turn around at the first sign of inclement weather. 
Winter hiking anywhere in the White Mountains requires specialized equipment and skills, as severe storms can develop suddenly. High winds and low temperatures can combine to make winter conditions on Mount Adams approximately equal to the worst reported from Antarctica.

There are numerous direct routes to the summit of Mount Adams.
One popular route on Adams year-round is the Valley Way, which connects with the Gulfside Trail and Lowe's Path. The Air Line is considered the standard winter route on Mount Adams, as it is perhaps the most direct route to the summit. The last 1,000 feet of this route are extremely exposed, leaving mountaineers vulnerable to the storms known to frequent mountains in the Presidential Range.

Due to their relative proximity, Mount Adams and nearby Mount Madison are frequently climbed on the same day by mountaineers. The route begins on the Valley Way, which brings hikers to the Madison Hut. From the Madison Hut, hikers can then access the summits of both Mount Madison and Mount Adams.

See also

 Thomas Starr King
 Four-thousand footers of New Hampshire
 List of people who died on the Presidential Range

References

 The 4000-Footers of the White Mountains: A Guide and History (2001) by Steven D. Smith and Mike Dickerman

External links
 
 Mount Washington web page
 Paintings of Mount Adams
  PeakBagger.com: Mount Adams
  summitpost.org: Mount Adams
 AMC: Hiking Mount Adams
  hikethewhites.com: Mount Adams

Mountains of New Hampshire
White Mountains (New Hampshire)
Mountains of Coös County, New Hampshire